The following is a list of people from the island of Crete in southern Greece.

Ancient

Mythology
See also :Category:Cretan mythology and History of Crete

Acacallis daughter of Minos.
Aerope  granddaughter of Minos.
Androgeus son of Minos.
Ariadne daughter of Minos.
Asterion first king of Crete.
Bianna immigrant to ancient Gaul.
Catreus son of Minos.
Deucalion son of Minos, father of Idomeneus.
Dictys Cretensis legendary companion of Idomeneus, and the alleged author of a diary.
Glaucus (son of Minos)
Idomeneus son of Deucalion. He led the Cretan armies to the Trojan War in the side of Achaeans.
Minos son of Asterion, king of Crete and judge in the Greek underworld.
Rhadamanthus son of Asterion, king of Crete and judge in the Greek underworld.
Zeus father of the gods of Olympus, god of the sky, thunder and lightning.

Dorian

Archaic era
Thaletas early musician and lyric poet
Epimenides   (6th century BC) seer and philosopher-poet
Chersiphron and Metagenes, father and son, architects, builders of the Temple of Artemis at Ephesus
Aristocles, sculptor
Dipoenus and Scyllis sculptors
Hybrias lyric poet

Classical era (ca.500-335 BC)
Ergoteles  (5th century BC) Olympic runner of Knossos, migrant to Himera, Sicily.
Kresilas   (5th century BC) sculptor, famous for his "Pericles statue".
Brotachus of Gortyna, mercenary mentioned in an epigram of Simonides.
Sotades (early 4th century BC) Olympic runner. In his second Olympic victory, he ran for Ephesus.

In the army of Alexander the Great
Eurybotas and Ombrion, generals of archers
Nearchus admiral, geographer and explorer.
Sibyrtius general and satrap of Arachosia and Gedrosia.

Hellenistic period (323 BC- 69 BC)
Rhianus (3rd century BC), poet and scholar.
Lagoras (3rd century BC)  mercenary in the service of Ptolemy IV Philopator.

Roman period (69 BC-330)
Aenesidemus 1st century BC, Skeptical philosopher.
Lasthenes and Panares, generals who fought Metellus.
Saint Titus (1st century) follower of Paul and first bishop of Crete.
Lucillus of Tarrha writer.
Mesomedes (2nd century) composer and lyric poet.
Saint Philip (2nd century) bishop of Gortyna.
Saint Pinytus (2nd century) bishop of Knossos.

Byzantine period (330-824, 961-1204)
Moses of Crete (5th century) Jewish Messiah claimant 
Saint Andrew  (7th-century)  bishop of Gortyna, theologian and hymnographer
Saint Eumenes  (7th century) bishop of Gortyna
Saint Andrew (8th-century) martyr under Iconoclasm

Venetian period (1204-1669)
Pedro de Candia  (1485–1542)  mercenary and naturalized Spanish conquistador.
Constantine Corniaktos  (1517–1603)  wine merchant and wealthiest man in the Eastern European city of Lviv.

Clerics
Pope Alexander V  (ca. 1339–1410) antipope during the Western Schism.
Maximos Margunios (1549–1602) bishop of Cythera, scholar and philo-Latin theologian.
Patriarch Cyril of Constantinople and Alexandria (1572–1638).

Artists
Francisco Leontaritis (1518–1572) Renaissance composer, singer and hymnographer.
Michael Damaskinos (1530/35-1592/9) icon painter
Georgios Klontzas (1535-1608) icon painter
Theophanes the Cretan (?-1559) icon painter
El Greco (1541–1614) painter, icon painter, sculptor, and architect of the Spanish Renaissance.  
Theodore Poulakis (1622–1692) icon painter
Emmanuel Tzanes  (1637–1694) icon painter

Writers
Stephanos Sahlikis (1330 - after 1391) Greek satyrical poet in Cretan verse.   
Francesco Barozzi (1537–1604) Italian mathematician, astronomer, translator and writer in Latin.
Georgios Chortatzis (1545–1610)  Greek dramatist in Cretan verse.
Vitsentzos Kornaros (1553–1613/14) Greek romantic poet in Cretan verse.

Scholars
John Rhosos  (15th century)  scribe, calligraphist and translator.
Marcus Musurus (1470–1517) professor of Greek at the University of Padua, scholiast and epigrammatist.
Nicholas Kalliakis  (1645–1707) classical professor in universities of Italy.

Ottoman period (1669-1898)

Christian
Erasmus of Arcadia (18th century) Greek Orthodox bishop.
Daskalogiannis (?–1771) rebel against Ottoman rule.
Dimitrios Kallergis (1803–1867) statesman.
Eleftherios Venizelos (1864–1936) politician, Prime Minister of Greece.
Evangelos Sarris (1881–1917) army officer.
Emmanouil Tsouderos (1882–1956) economist and politician.
Nikos Kazantzakis (1885–1957) poet and author.

Muslim
See also Cretan Turks

Ahmed Resmî Efendi (18th century) statesman, diplomat and author.
Giritli Ali Aziz Efendi (18th century) Ottoman author, diplomat.
Salacıoğlu (1750–1825) (18th century) Turkish folk literature poet.
Giritli Sırrı Pasha (1844–1895) Ottoman author, statesman.
Leyla Saz woman poet and composer.
Rahmizâde Bahaeddin Bediz (1875–1951) the first Turkish professional photographer.
Paul Mulla (1882–1959) (alias Mollazade Mehmed Ali) Roman Catholic bishop and author.
Ali Fuat Cebesoy (1882–1968) Turkish statesman.
Mustafa Ertuğrul (1892–1961) Turkish naval officer.

Modern

Manolis Hatzidakis (1909-1998) art historian and author.
Manos Katrakis (1909–1984) actor.
Odysseas Elitis (1911–1996) poet, Nobel laureate.
Stylianos Pattakos (1912-2016) member of Greek military junta.
Konstantinos Mitsotakis (1918-2017) politician, Prime Minister of Greece.
Rena Kyriakou (1918–1994) pianist.
Ilya Livykou (1919–2002) actress.
George Psychoundakis (1920–2006) World War II resistance fighter, poet and translator.
Thanasis Skordalos (1920–1998) Cretan folk singer and composer.
Mikis Theodorakis (1925) musician.
Kostas Mountakis (1926–1991) folk singer and composer.
Terpsichori Chryssoulaki-Vlachou (1926–1944) member of the Greek resistance.
John Aniston (1933) actor.
Rika Diallina (1934) actress.
Nana Mouskouri (1934) singer and politician.
Rita Sakellariou (1934–1999) singer.
Nikos Xilouris (1936–1980) composer and singer.
Konstantinos Volanakis (1937) painter.
Giannis Markopoulos (1939) composer.
Manolis Mavrommatis (1941) sports journalist and politician.
Psarantonis (1942) musician and singer.
Christoforos Liontakis (1945) poet.
Yannis Smaragdis (1946) film director.
Maro Douka (1947) author.
Giannis Dragasakis (1947) politician.
Fotis Kafatos biologist
Joseph Sifakis (1946) computer scientist, laureate of the 2007 Turing Award.
Nikolaos Sifounakis (1949) politician.
Mimis Androulakis (1951) author and politician.
Maria Damanaki (1952) politician.
Manolis Kefalogiannis (1959) politician.
Kostas Hatzidakis (1965) politician.
Nikos Machlas (1973) footballer.
Georgios Samaras (1985) footballer.

References
 

 
Cretan
People
Crete